A general election for the New South Wales Legislative Assembly was held in the state of New South Wales, Australia, on Saturday 1 May 1976. The result was a narrow win for the Labor Party under Neville Wran—the party's first in the state in more than a decade.

Issues 
The incumbent Liberal-Country Party coalition had lost its longtime leader, Sir Robert Askin, at the end of 1974. Upon Askin's retirement in January 1975, Eric Willis was seen as the favourite to take the premiership. However, despite Askin's initial support, Willis refused his help, preferring to gain the leadership on his own merits. Askin then put his support behind the Minister for Lands, Tom Lewis. Willis, sure he had support, refused to campaign, and the party put its support behind Lewis, leading to his election to Premier. However, a leadership spill followed in January 1976, and Willis then became Premier.

When former Minister Steve Mauger resigned on 27 January 1976, sparking a by-election in his seat of Monaro in May, and early polls had indicated a large swing to Labor, Willis announced an early election on 1 May, thereby cancelling the by-election in the hope of preventing a larger move of voters against the government.  

Wran successfully emerged from the shadow of the defeated Whitlam Labor government at a federal level. Labor's campaign focussed largely on the leader himself, what Australians call a "Presidential" style campaign. The state party had undergone a long process of renewal, and emerged with strong moderate credentials. Labor also offered an alternative to a long-serving government widely perceived as corrupt.

Wran's campaign slogan, "Let's put the state in better shape," delivered by the leader and key spokesmen Peter Cox and Syd Einfeld, resonated with voters.

Key dates

Results 

The election was in doubt for several days.  Ultimately, the seats of Gosford and Hurstville fell to Labor by only 74 and 44 votes respectively.  Had the Coalition retained these seats, it would have stayed in power with a one-seat majority.  As it turned out, the loss of Gosford and Hurstville gave Wran a one-seat majority.

{{Australian elections/Title row
| table style = float:right;clear:right;margin-left:1em;
| title        = New South Wales state election, 1 May 1976
| house        = Legislative Assembly
| series       = New South Wales state election
| back         = 1973
| forward      = 1978
| enrolled     = 2,943,248
| total_votes  = 2,745,749
| turnout %    = 93.29
| turnout chg  = +0.78
| informal     = 48,220
| informal %   = 1.76
| informal chg = –0.94
}}
	

|}

{{ bar box |float=right | title=Popular vote | titlebar=#ddd | width=600px | barwidth=410px | bars= 

}}

Seats changing hands

 Members listed in italics did not recontest their seats.
 In addition, Labor retained the seat of Coogee, which it had won from the Liberals at the 1974 by-election.

Post-election pendulum

See also
Candidates of the 1976 New South Wales state election

Notes

References

Elections in New South Wales
1976 elections in Australia
1970s in New South Wales
May 1976 events in Australia